Organ2/ASLSP (As Slow as Possible) is a musical piece by John Cage and the subject of one of the longest-lasting musical performances yet undertaken. Cage wrote it in 1987 for organ, as an adaptation of his 1985 composition ASLSP for piano. A performance of the piano version usually lasts 20 to 70 minutes.

An organ in St. Burchardi church in Halberstadt in 2001 began a performance that is due to end in 2640. The next note will be played on February 5, 2024.

History
The Friends of the Maryland Summer Institute for the Creative and Performing Arts commissioned the piece for contemporary requirement of a piano competition. Cage used an open format to ensure no two performances would be the same, and give judges a break from the consistency of most compositions. The score is eight pages.

Performances
Diane Luchese played Organ2/ASLSP from 8:45 am to 11:41 pm on February 5, 2009, at Towson University. This 14-hour-56-minute performance was the longest recorded individual performance until 2022. YouTube and Twitch channel 'AllRequest/ AllRequest_Live' performed an adapted version of ASLSP to a live audience for 24 hours, from 12:00am on February 4, 2022 to 12:00am on February 5, 2022. Stephen Whittington performed an 8-hour version of ASLSP on the Elder Hall organ for John Cage Day in 2012 at the University of Adelaide. Organists Patrick Wedd, Adrian Foster, and Alex Ross gave a 12-hour team performance at Christ Church Cathedral, Montreal, in 2015. Daniel Cooper gave a 12-hour performance in Knox Church to mark the Southern Hemisphere's winter solstice in 2019. Christopher Anderson gave a 16-hour performance, currently the second slowest performance and longest complete performance on record, on March 8, 2022 at Perkins Chapel on the campus of Southern Methodist University.

Halberstadt performance

Background
Musicians and philosophers discussed Cage's instruction to play "as slow as possible" at a conference in 1997, because a properly maintained pipe organ could sound indefinitely. The John Cage Organ Foundation Halberstadt decided to play the piece for 639 years, to mark the time between the first documented permanent organ installation in Halberstadt Cathedral, in 1361, and the proposed start date of 2000. The Foundation sells plaques commemorating the years through 2640 to fund the performance.

The instrument
An organ was built specifically for the performance. It is in the church's right transept, with the bellows in the left transept. 

Acrylic glass encases it to reduce the volume.

Performance
The Halberstadt performance started on September 5, 2001, with a rest lasting until February 5, 2003, when the first chord played. Sandbags depress the organ's pedals to maintain the notes. Two more organ pipes were added alongside the four already installed and the tone became more complex at 15:33 local time. The bellows provide a constant supply of air to keep the pipes playing. On July 5, 2012 two more organ pipes were taken out, and two were in the organ. The note changed on September 5, 2020. The performance is scheduled to end on September 5, 2640.

See also
 AS Long as Possible, a GIF-based visual art work named in tribute to As Slow as Possible
 List of compositions by John Cage
 Longplayer

References

External links
 Website of the Halberstadt event 
 As Slow As Possible, Performance Today feature (National Public Radio), September 2003
 Recordings of a nine-hour performance of ASLSP at ARTSaha! 2006 by Joseph Drew: Hour One, Hour Six, Hour Nine
 Die eingefrorene Zeit, Die Zeit, January 8, 2006 
 Website of the documentary film ASAP by Scott Smith
 "World's longest concert will last 639 years" The Washington Post. November 21, 2011.

1987 compositions
27th century
Compositions by John Cage
Compositions for organ